is a Japanese footballer currently playing as a midfielder for Zemplín Michalovce.

Career
Born in Tokyo, Japan, Shimamura attended the Tokyo Kurume High School. In January 2018, without even attending his graduation ceremony, Shimamura flew to Argentina to sign for Newell's Old Boys. While in Rosario, he played mostly for Newell's under-23 side.

Shimamura moved to Slovakia in August 2021, signing with ŠK Tvrdošín. He would go on to score 5 goals for Tvrdošín, before attracting interest from first division club Zemplín Michalovce, who he would sign for on loan in January 2022.

Career statistics

Club

Notes

References

External links
 Yushi Shimamura at sportnet.sme.sk 
 Yushi Shimamura at mfkzemplin.sk 

1999 births
Living people
Association football people from Tokyo
Japanese footballers
Japanese expatriate footballers
Association football midfielders
MFK Zemplín Michalovce players
4. Liga (Slovakia) players
Slovak Super Liga players
Japanese expatriate sportspeople in Slovakia
Expatriate footballers in Slovakia